The Sign of Four (a.k.a. Sir Arthur Conan Doyle's The Sign of Four) is a 1983 British made-for-television mystery film directed by Desmond Davis and starring Ian Richardson and David Healy.  The film is based on Sir Arthur Conan Doyle's 1890 novel of the same name, the second novel to feature Sherlock Holmes and Doctor Watson.

Production

In 1982, American producer Sy Weintraub partnered with English producer Otto Plaschkes to make six television films of Sherlock Holmes stories. Charles Edward Pogue was enlisted to pen the screenplays but only The Sign of the Four and The Hound of the Baskervilles were ultimately filmed as Granada Television's Sherlock Holmes series premiered in 1984.

In an interview with Scarlet Street, Ian Richardson explained:

The Sign of Four was shot simultaneously with The Hound of the Baskervilles but the schedule precluded having David Healy portray Watson in both films so Donald Churchill was enlisted to play the role in The Hound of the Baskervilles. Two previous Watsons appear in the film: Terence Rigby who played Watson to Tom Baker's Holmes in 1982s The Hound of the Baskervilles and Thorley Walters who played Watson three times previously; with Christopher Lee as Holmes in Sherlock Holmes and the Deadly Necklace, with Douglas Wilmer as Holmes in The Adventure of Sherlock Holmes' Smarter Brother and with Christopher Plummer as Holmes in Silver Blaze. Clive Merrison, who plays Bartholomew Sholto, would go on to played Holmes in the long running radio series.

Cast 
Ian Richardson as Sherlock Holmes
David Healy as Dr. John H. Watson
Thorley Walters as Major John Sholto
Cherie Lunghi as Mary Morstan
Joe Melia as Jonathan Small
Clive Merrison as Bartholomew Sholto
Richard Heffer as Thaddeus Sholto
Terence Rigby as Inspector Layton 
Michael O'Hagan as Mordecai Smith
Robert Russell as Williams

Differences from novel 
The plot includes the recovery of the Agra treasure, which here was hidden in Small's wooden leg as he attempts to claim he disposed of it in the Thames. After Holmes realises what has happened due to the wooden leg's suspicious weight in the water, the treasure is claimed by the police (although its most precious piece, a large diamond called the Great Mogul, is given to Mary by Holmes). In the novel, Small disposes of the entire treasure into the Thames.
Unlike the source novel, the movie features the murder of Thaddeus Sholto, where Small returns to the house to try and intimidate him into revealing the location of the treasure, beating Sholto to death in a rage when Sholto claims that it was given away long ago.
While Watson expresses a strong attraction for Miss Morstan, a romantic development between the two characters is not implied in the movie, being displayed only in slight "romantic touches".
The original novel features a local detective named Athelney Jones working in tandem with Holmes and Watson. In this version, Jones is swapped for Inspector Lestrade, although the detective's name has been changed to "Layton". It is clear that in the original film, the name Lestrade was used but later dubbed over and changed to Layton (likely for copyright purposes).

See also
The Hound of the Baskervilles (1983 film)

References

External links 

1983 television films
1983 films
1980s mystery films
Sherlock Holmes films based on works by Arthur Conan Doyle
British television films
British mystery films
Films directed by Desmond Davis
Films with screenplays by Charles Edward Pogue
1980s British films